The 1st Brigade, 7th Infantry Division was an infantry brigade of the United States Army, and a part of the 7th Infantry Division. The brigade was based at Fort Ord, California for most of its history. After the Korean War, it was activated as a brigade in 1963, and was returned to the United States where it saw action in Operation Just Cause and Operation Golden Pheasant before being finally deactivated in 1995.

The 7th ID remained in Korea near the DMZ from the truce in 1953 until 1971, participating in “The Second Korean War” from 1966 to 1969.

History

Post-Korean War
In the wake of the Korean War, between 1953 and 1971, the 7th Infantry Division defended the Korean Demilitarized Zone. Its main garrison was Camp Casey, South Korea. During this period, the division was restructured in compliance with the Reorganization Objective Army Divisions tables of organization. In 1963, the division's former headquarters company grew into the 1st Brigade, 7th Infantry Division. On 2 April 1971, the division and its brigades returned to the United States and inactivated at Fort Lewis, Washington.

In October 1974 the 7th and two brigades reactivated at their former garrison, Fort Ord. The division was tasked to keep a close watch on South American developments. It trained at Fort Ord, Camp Roberts, and Fort Hunter Liggett. On 1 October 1985 the division redesignated as the 7th Infantry Division (Light), organized again as a light infantry division. The various battalions of the 17th, 31st, and 32nd Regiments moved from the division, replaced by battalions from other regiments, including battalions from the 21st Infantry Regiment, the 27th Infantry Regiment, and the 9th Infantry Regiment. The 27th Infantry and the 9th Infantry Regiment participated in Operation Golden Pheasant in Honduras. In 1989 the 1st Brigade (or 9th Infantry Regiment as it was more commonly known), 7th Infantry Division participated in Operation Just Cause in Panama.

The 1991 Base Realignment and Closure Commission recommended the closing of Fort Ord due to the escalating cost of living on the central California coastline. By 1994, the garrison was to be closed and the division was to relocate to Fort Lewis, Washington.

In 1993 the division was slated to move to Fort Lewis, WA and inactivate as part of the post-Cold War drawdown of the US Army. The 1st Brigade relocated to Ft. Lewis and was later reflagged as the 1st Brigade, 25th Infantry Division while the division headquarters formally inactivated on 16 June 1994 at Fort Lewis.

Honors

Unit decorations

Campaign streamers

References

Sources

External links
 7th Infantry Division Home Page

Infantry 007 01
Military units of the United States Army in South Korea
Military units and formations established in 1917
Military units and formations disestablished in 1994